Bugojno is a town and municipality located in Central Bosnia Canton of the Federation of Bosnia and Herzegovina, an entity of Bosnia and Herzegovina. It is situated on river Vrbas,  to the northwest from Sarajevo. According to the 2013 census, the town has a population of 15,555 inhabitants, with 31,470 inhabitants in the municipality. 

To the west towards Kupres is a region called Koprivica. This enormous forest was once one of President Tito's favorite hunting spots. The uninhabited dense forest has created a sanctuary for wild animals. Hunting associations are very active in this region and there are many mountain and hunting lodges dotting the forest. Duboka Valley (deep valley) is a designated hunting area covered by thick spruce. Kalin Mountain is a popular weekend area for hikers and nature lovers.

Geography

The municipality has an average elevation of 570 metres above sea level. Much of its 366 km2 is forested. The terrain is mountainous with several prominent features. Stozer (1662m), Kalin (1,530m) and Rudina (1,385m) are the tallest mountains in Bugojno.

Demographics
The town and municipality is inhabited by a Bosniak majority. The town, prior to the war, was multi-ethnic, with virtually identical numbers of Croats, Bosniaks and Serbs. Today, only 325 Serbs live in the town, with 376 in the municipality. The number of Croats in the municipality has gone down from 16,031 to 5,767 (2013 census).

Town
In 1991 town of Bugojno had a population of 22,641 including;

Bosniaks (6,878)
Croats (6,836)
Serbs (6,809)
Yugoslavs (1,449)
 and 667 others

Municipality

Climate

Economy
Bugojno was once a major industrial centre in Bosnia and Herzegovina. In 1981, Bugojno's GDP per capita was 98% of the Yugoslav average. However, hardships caused by the war in Bosnia and Herzegovina took a toll on the industry and overall economy of Bugojno. Apart from industry, forestry has been an important contributor to the local economy and continues to be. In recent years, agriculture has grown in sustaining the Bugojno's economy as many people are investing in land and agronomy.

Notable people
Edin Atić (born 1997), basketball player
Željko Bebek (born 1945), singer
Ivona Dadic (born 1993), Austrian heptathlete, whose parents were born in Bugojno
Zenit Đozić (born 1961), actor and humorist
Vlatko Marković (1937–2013), football executive, former manager and footballer
Branko Mikulić (1928–1994), Prime Minister of Yugoslavia (1986–1989), President of Organizing Committee of 1984 Winter Olympics
Stjepan Tomas (born 1976), manager and former footballer 
Ermin Zec (born 1988), footballer

Gallery

References

External links

Teatar FEDRA Bugojno
Bug.ba

 
Populated places in Bugojno